The Gimenez staining technique uses biological stains to detect and identify bacterial infections in tissue samples.  Although largely superseded by techniques like Giemsa staining, the Gimenez technique may be valuable for detecting certain slow-growing or fastidious bacteria.

Basic fuchsin stain  in aqueous solution with phenol and ethanol colours many bacteria (both gram positive and Gram negative) red, magenta, or pink.  A malachite green counterstain gives a blue-green background cast to the surrounding tissue.

See also
Histology
List of common staining protocols
Microscopy

References
 P. Bruneval et al.. "Detection of fastidious bacteria in cardiac valves in cases of blood culture negative endocarditis." Journal of Clinical Pathology. 54:238-240 (2001).
 D.F. Gimenez. "Staining Rickettsiae in yolksack cultures". Stain Technol 39:135–40 (1964).

Staining